The 2021 All-Big Ten Conference football team consists of American football players chosen as All-Big Ten Conference players for the 2021 Big Ten Conference football season.  The conference recognizes two official All-Big Ten selectors: (1) the Big Ten conference coaches selected separate offensive and defensive units and named first-, second- and third-team players (the "Coaches" team); and (2) a panel of sports writers and broadcasters covering the Big Ten also selected offensive and defensive units and named first-, second- and third-team players (the "Media" team).

Key

Offensive selections

Quarterbacks
 C. J. Stroud, Ohio State (Coaches-1; Media-1)
 Aidan O'Connell, Purdue (Coaches-2; Media-2)
 Cade McNamara, Michigan (Coaches-3; Media-3)

Running backs
 Kenneth Walker, Michigan State (Coaches-1; Media-1)
 Hassan Haskins, Michigan (Coaches-1; Media-1)
 TreVeyon Henderson, Ohio State (Coaches-2; Media-2)
 Braelon Allen, Wisconsin (Coaches-2; Media-2)
 Chase Brown, Illinois (Coaches-3; Media-3)
 Blake Corum, Michigan (Coaches-3)
 Tyler Goodson, Iowa (Media-3)

Wide receivers
 David Bell, Purdue (Coaches-1; Media-1)
 Chris Olave, Ohio State (Coaches-1; Media-2)
 Jahan Dotson, Penn State (Coaches-2; Media-1)
 Garrett Wilson, Ohio State (Coaches-2; Media-2)
 Jayden Reed, Michigan State (Coaches-3; Media-3)
 Jaxon Smith-Njigba, Ohio State (Coaches-3; Media-3)

Centers
 Tyler Linderbaum, Iowa (Coaches-1; Media-1)
 John Michael Schmitz, Minnesota (Coaches-2; Media-3)
 Doug Kramer, Illinois (Coaches-2)
 Andrew Vastardis, Michigan (Media-2)
 Cam Jurgens, Nebraska (Coaches-3)

Guards
 Thayer Munford, Ohio State (Coaches-1; Media-1)
 Josh Seltzner, Wisconsin (Coaches-1; Media-2)
 Blaise Andries, Minnesota (Coaches-3; Media-1)
 Kyler Schott, Iowa (Coaches-2; Media-3)
 Paris Johnson Jr., Ohio State (Coaches-2; Media-3)
 Zak Zinter, Michigan (Media-2)
 Conner Olson, Minnesota (Coaches-3)

Tackles
 Nicholas Petit-Frere, Ohio State (Coaches-1; Media-1)
 Daniel Faalele, Minnesota (Coaches-1; Media-3)
 Andrew Stueber, Michigan (Coaches-3; Media-1)
 Peter Skoronski, Northwestern (Coaches-2; Media-1)
 Logan Bruss, Wisconsin (Coaches-2; Media-2)
 Ryan Hayes, Michigan (Coaches-2)
 Dawand Jones, Ohio State (Coaches-3, Media-2)
 Tyler Beach, Wisconsin (Coaches-3)
 Rasheed Walker, Penn State (Media-3)

Tight ends
 Jake Ferguson, Wisconsin (Coaches-1; Media-2)
 Austin Allen, Nebraska (Coaches-2; Media-1)
 Sam LaPorta, Iowa (Coaches-3)
 Peyton Hendershot, Indiana (Media-3)

Defensive selections

Defensive linemen
 Arnold Ebiketie, Penn State (Coaches-1; Media-1)
 Haskell Garrett, Ohio State (Coaches-1; Media-1)
 Aidan Hutchinson, Michigan (Coaches-1; Media-1)
 George Karlaftis, Purdue (Coaches-1; Media-1)
 Jacub Panasiuk, Michigan State (Coaches-2; Media-2)
 Zach VanValkenburg, Iowa (Coaches-2; Media-2)
 Zach Harrison, Ohio State (Coaches-3; Media-2)
 Boye Mafe, Minnesota (Coaches-3; Media-2)
 Tyreke Smith, Ohio State (Coaches-2; Media-3)
 Matt Henningsen, Wisconsin (Coaches-3; Media-3)
 PJ Mustipher, Penn State (Coaches-2)
 Keeanu Benton, Wisconsin (Coaches-2)
 Sam Okuayinonu, Maryland (Coaches-3)
 Jacob Slade, Michigan State (Media-3)
 Jesse Luketa, Penn State (Media-3)

Linebackers
 Leo Chenal, Wisconsin (Coaches-1; Media-1)
 David Ojabo, Michigan (Coaches-1; Media-1)
 Jack Sanborn, Wisconsin (Coaches-1; Media-2)
 Jack Campbell, Iowa (Coaches-3; Media-1)
 Micah McFadden, Indiana (Coaches-2; Media-2)
 Chris Bergin, Northwestern (Coaches-3; Media-2)
 JoJo Domann, Nebraska (Coaches-2; Media-3)
 Ellis Brooks, Penn State (Coaches-2)
 Brandon Smith, Penn State (Coaches-3)
 Josh Ross, Michigan (Media-3)
 Olakunle Fatukasi, Rutgers (Media-3)

Defensive backs
 Dane Belton, Iowa (Coaches-1; Media-1)
 Jaquan Brisker, Penn State (Coaches-1; Media-1)
 Riley Moss, Iowa (Coaches-1; Media-1)
 Daxton Hill, Michigan (Coaches-1; Media-2)
 Kerby Joseph, Illinois (Coaches-2; Media-1)
 Matt Hankins, Iowa (Coaches-2; Media-2)
 Cam Taylor-Britt, Nebraska (Coaches-2; Media-2)
 Ronnie Hickman, Ohio State (Coaches-2; Media-3)
 Brandon Joseph, Northwestern (Media-2)
 Denzel Burke, Ohio State (Coaches-3)
 Ji'Ayir Brown, Penn State (Coaches-3)
 Joey Porter Jr., Penn State (Coaches-3)
 Caesar Williams, Wisconsin (Coaches-3)
 Vincent Gray, Michigan (Media-3)
 Brad Hawkins, Michigan (Media-3)
 Xavier Henderson, Michigan State (Media-3)

Special teams

Kickers
 Jake Moody, Michigan (Coaches-1; Media-3)
 Caleb Shudak, Iowa (Coaches-2; Media-1)
 Noah Ruggles, Ohio State (Coaches-2; Media-2)
 James McCourt, Illinois (Coaches-3)

Punters
 Jordan Stout, Penn State (Coaches-1; Media-1)
 Adam Korsak, Rutgers (Coaches-1; Media-3)
 Bryce Baringer, Michigan State (Coaches-2; Media-2)
 Blake Hayes, Illinois (Coaches-3)

Return specialist
 Charlie Jones, Iowa (Coaches-1; Media-1)
 Jayden Reed, Michigan State (Coaches-2; Media-2)
 A. J. Henning, Michigan (Coaches-3; Media-3)
 Jahan Dotson, Penn State (Coaches-3)

See also
 2021 College Football All-America Team

References

All-Big Ten Conference
All-Big Ten Conference football teams